Townships, formally township-level divisions, are the basic level (fourth-level administrative units) of political divisions in the People's Republic of China. They are similar to municipalities and communes in other countries and in turn may contain village committees and villages. In 1995 there were 29,648 townships and 17,570 towns (a total of 47,218 township-level divisions) in China which included the territories held by the Republic of China and claimed by the PRC.

Much like other levels of government in mainland China, the township's governance is divided between the Communist Party Township Secretary, and the "county magistrate". The township party secretary, along with the township's party committee, determines policy. The magistrate is in charge of administering the daily affairs of government and executing policies as determined by the party committee. A township official is the lowest-level ranked official in the civil service hierarchy; in practice, however, the township party secretary and magistrate can amass high levels of personal power.

A township government is formally responsible for local economic development, planning, maintenance of local roads, family planning, sanitation & health, sports, and "other responsibilities as determined by higher level governments".

Types of townships

Urban
Subdistricts
Towns

Rural

Townships
Sums of Inner Mongolia
Ethnic townships, towns, and sums

History 
After the founding of the People's Republic of China in 1949, there was a lack of uniform regulations for establishing towns, and there were too many towns formed. By the end of 1954, there were 5,400 towns throughout the country, including 920 with a population of less than 2,000, 2,302 with a population of 2,000-5,000, 1,373 with a population of 5,000-10,000, 784 with a population of 10,000-50,000, and 21 with a population over 50,000. In June 1955, the State Council issued the "Decision on the Establishment of Cities and Towns", which clarified the criteria for the establishment of towns. By the end of 1978, there were only 2,173 townships in the country. After the abolition of the people's commune system, the establishment of townships was given importance.

On 29 November 1984, the State Council announced new standards for the establishment of townships.

 All local state organs at the county level should be set up as townships.
 Townships with a total population of less than 20,000 and a non-agricultural population of more than 2,000 in the seat of the township government may be established.
 For communes with a total population of more than 20,000, towns may be established if the non-agricultural population of the commune's governmental seat accounts for more than 10% of the commune's population.
 Ethnic minority areas, sparsely populated remote areas, mountainous areas and small industrial and mining areas, small ports, scenic tourist areas, border crossings, etc., although the non-agricultural population of less than 2,000, if necessary, can also set up towns.

List of township-level divisions

Provinces
List of township-level divisions of Anhui
List of township-level divisions of Fujian
List of township-level divisions of Gansu
List of township-level divisions of Guangdong
List of township-level divisions of Guizhou
List of township-level divisions of Hainan
List of township-level divisions of Hebei
List of township-level divisions of Heilongjiang
List of township-level divisions of Henan
List of township-level divisions of Hubei
List of township-level divisions of Hunan
List of township-level divisions of Jiangsu
List of township-level divisions of Jiangxi
List of township-level divisions of Jilin
List of township-level divisions of Liaoning
List of township-level divisions of Qinghai
List of township-level divisions of Shaanxi
List of township-level divisions of Shandong
List of township-level divisions of Shanxi
List of township-level divisions of Sichuan
List of township-level divisions of Yunnan
List of township-level divisions of Zhejiang
 Autonomous areas
List of township-level divisions of Guangxi
List of township-level divisions of Inner Mongolia
List of township-level divisions of Ningxia
List of township-level divisions of the Tibet Autonomous Region
List of township-level divisions of Xinjiang
Municipalities
List of township-level divisions of Beijing
List of township-level divisions of Chongqing
List of township-level divisions of Shanghai
List of township-level divisions of Tianjin

Similar to township units
A similar to township unit in the system of administrative divisions of the People's Republic of China is a region with self-jurisdiction which functions at a PRC township-level administrative division. Divisions of this sort can include development zones, science and technology parks, university cities, companies, farms, fishing ground, ranches, orchards, national parks, etc., even prisons.

The township-level administrative division (the lowest level division) includes townships, towns, subdistricts, ethnic townships, and sums. Some county-level administrative districts that govern towns and villages will also be defined as a similar to township unit, as in the case of the Jiaozishan Tourism Development Zone and Industrial Park of Kunming.

References

External links
Citypopulation.de: Population by township in China

 
 01
Administrative divisions of China
Populated places in China
China
Townships, China